Nathan Rosenberg (November 22, 1927 – August 24, 2015) was an American economist specializing in the history of technology.

Biography
Rosenberg earned his PhD from the University of Wisconsin in 1955, and taught at Indiana University (1955–1957), the University of Pennsylvania (1957–1961), Purdue University (1961–1964), Harvard University (1967–1969), the University of Wisconsin (1969–1974) and  Stanford University (1974–), where he was the Fairleigh S. Dickinson, Jr. Professor Emeritus of Public Policy in the Department of Economics. In 1989 he was visiting Pitt Professor of American History and Institutions at the University of Cambridge.

Rosenberg's contribution to understanding technological change was acknowledged by Douglass C. North in his Nobel Prize lecture entitled "Economic Performance through Time". In 1996 he was awarded the Leonardo da Vinci Medal, the highest award of the Society for the History of Technology.

In 1986's How the West Grew Rich, Rosenberg and co-author L.E. Birdzell, Jr. argued that Western Europe's economic success grew out of a loosening of political and religious controls, and that Western medieval life was not actually organized in castles, cathedrals, and cities; but that it was organized more in the rural areas in huts and in places with reliable access to food. This is why, the book states, most of the population was to some extent involved in agriculture and its related occupations of transporting produce from place to place. The importance of these ideas have since been more fully recognized by the discipline of international economic history. The Rosenberg-Birdzell hypothesis is that innovation is produced by economic competition among politically independent entities. This hypothesis is tested and supported by Joel Mokyr in his contribution to the Festschrift-issue of Research Policy, which was published in honor of Nathan Rosenberg in 1994.

Publications

Books
 Economic Planning in the British Building Industry, 1945–1949, 1960
 The American System of Manufactures: The Report of the Committee on the Machinery of the United States 1855, and the Special Reports of George Wallis and Joseph Whitworth, 1854, 1969
 The Economics of Technological Change: Selected Readings, 1971
 Technology and American Economic Growth, 1972
 Perspectives on Technology, 1976
 The Britannia Bridge: The Generation and Diffusion of Technological Knowledge (with Walter G. Vincenti), 1978
 Inside the Black Box: Technology and Economics, 1983
 International Technology Transfer: Concepts, Measures, and Comparisons (editor, with Claudio Frischtak), 1985
 The Positive Sum Strategy: Harnessing Technology for Economic Growth (editor, with Ralph Landau), 1986
 How The West Grew Rich: The Economic Transformation Of The Industrial World (with L. E. Birdzell), 1986
 Technology and the Pursuit of Economic Growth (with David C. Mowery), 1991
 Technology and the Wealth of Nations (editor, with Ralph Landau and David C. Mowery), 1992
 Exploring the Black Box: Technology, Economics, and History, 1994
 The Emergence of Economic Ideas: Essays in the History of Economics, 1994
 Paths of Innovation: Technological Change in 20th-Century America (with David C. Mowery), 1998
 Chemicals and Long-Term Economic Growth: Insights from the Chemical Industry (editor, with Ashish Arora and Ralph Landau), 2000
 Schumpeter and the Endogeneity of Technology: Some American Perspectives, 2000 (The Graz Schumpeter Lectures)

Notes

External links

Nathan Rosenberg, Stanford professor and expert on the economic history of technology, dead at 87 - September 1, 2015

Innovation economists
1927 births
2015 deaths
University of Wisconsin–Madison alumni
Writers from Passaic, New Jersey
Members of the Royal Swedish Academy of Engineering Sciences
Academics of the University of Cambridge
Stanford University Department of Economics faculty
American economic historians
Historians of economic thought
Historians of technology
Leonardo da Vinci Medal recipients
Economists from New Jersey
Historians from New Jersey